Nejdet is a Turkish masculine given name. Notable people with the name include:

Nejdet Sançar (1910–1975), Turkish literature teacher 
Nejdet Zalev (born 1937), Bulgarian Olympic wrestler

See also
Necdet

Turkish masculine given names